Vlachovo is a village and municipality in the Rožňava District in the Košice Region of middle-eastern Slovakia.

History 
In historical records the village was first mentioned in 1427 as Alahpathaka, but until the end of the 14th century it was also referred to as Lampertfalva. In 1597 it was referred to as Oláhpataka alias Lampertsdorf. Since then it was called Oláhpatak, and rarely Oláh Pataka. Slovaks referred to the commune also as Vlachov or Wlachowo. When it became part of Czechoslovakia, its name became Vlachovo.

Geography 
The village lies at an altitude of 397 metres and covers an area of 37.332 km2.

Demographics
It has a population of 839 people (2015).

Culture 
The village has a public library, a gymnasium and a swimming pool.

Notable people
 Gyula Andrássy, (1823 in Oláhpatak – 1890), Hungarian statesman, Prime Minister of Hungary (1867–1871) and Foreign Minister of Austria-Hungary (1871–1879).

References

External links 
 http://www.vlachovo.eu
 Vlachovo
 https://web.archive.org/web/20071116010355/http://www.statistics.sk/mosmis/eng/run.html

Villages and municipalities in Rožňava District
Andrássy family